Robert Hogg may refer to:

Bob Hogg, Australian politician
Rob Hogg (born 1967), American state senator from the 19th district of Iowa
Robert Hogg (biologist) (1818–1897), British scientist
Robert V. Hogg (1924–2014), American statistician and professor at the University of Iowa
Robert Hogg (footballer) (1877–1963), English football player with Sunderland and Blackpool
Robert Hogg (New Zealand politician) (1864–1941), New Zealand politician, journalist, newspaper editor and poet
Robert Lynn Hogg (1893–1973), U.S. Representative from West Virginia
Robert Hogg (poet) (born 1942), Canadian poet, critic, professor, and organic farmer

See also
Bobby Hogg (disambiguation)